Laima Vaikule (born 31 March 1954) is a Latvian actress, singer, director, and choreographer, best known in Europe and in the former USSR for such popular hits as "Vernisage" and "Charlie," among other songs.

Biography
Vaikule was born on 31 March 1954, in Cēsis, Latvia. Her parents moved to Riga when she was three. Young Laima was fond of music and dancing. In 1966, at the age of 12, she took part in a competition of young singers and was noticed. Between 1970 and 1973, she studied nursing at the Vilnius Medical College, while also continuing to sing with a band. Eventually, she became a lead singer with a local band in Riga, Latvia and worked night gigs at local clubs and restaurants for several years. In the 1980s she studied acting and directing at Moscow State Institute for Theatrical Arts (GITIS), graduating as actress and director.

In 1985, Laima Vaikule made her first hit in the Soviet Union. Since 1986, Vaikule has been enjoying a fruitful collaboration with popular Latvian composer, Raimonds Pauls, and Russian poet Ilya Reznik, who wrote such hits as "Vernisage", "Charlie" and "Skripach na kryshe" ("Fiddler on the roof"). She is among the original organizers of the Jurmala Festival of popular music, along with Raimonds Pauls. During the 1980s and 1990s Laima Vaikule was a regular participant at international music competitions and festivals across Europe. Vaikule was awarded the Golden Lyra at the 1987 Bratislavská lýra, was a guest singer and a host at "Jurmala 92" festival, and also took part at "AU music world" in Monaco, among other festivals and competitions. She was awarded the title Peoples Artist of Latvia (1995) and the Grand Music Award (1996) for her special contribution to the music and culture of Latvia.

Personal life 

Vaikule is currently living and working in Riga, Latvia and owns a second home in Moscow, Russia. She is an animal rights activist and a vegetarian.

Controversy 

In a 2018 interview to the Ukrainian press, when asked about performing in the Russian-annexed Crimea, Vaikule responded "I won't go there, whatever royalties they offer me" and explained "I'm a citizen of the European Union, I don't have the right to travel there", receiving criticism from Russian Senator Aleksey Pushkov and several Russian cultural figures. Vaikule later went on Russian national television, where she said her answer had been misinterpreted and what she meant was that the law forbids her from going to Crimea, not that she would not want to perform there. When asked by the anchor, whether she would perform in Crimea if no Latvian law forbade it, Vaikule answered positively.

Popular songs
 It's Not Evening Yet 
 Yellow Leaves 
 Vernisage 
 What Does the Pianist Play  
 Fiddler On the Roof 
 Charlie 
 On Piccadilly Street

Awards and honors
 Zlatá Bratislavská lyra (1987)
  (1990)
 World Music Awards (1993)
 Peoples Artist of Latvia (1995)
 Grand Music Award (1996)
 Order of Friendship (2011)
 Certificate of Merit of the President of Latvia (2019)
 Golden Gramophone Award (2019)

|-
! colspan="3" style="background: cyan;" | World Music Awards
|-

|-

References

External links
Official site 

Laima Vaikule at the World Music Awards 1993

1954 births
Living people
People from Cēsis
20th-century Latvian women singers
Latvian stage actresses
Latvian film actresses
20th-century Latvian actresses
21st-century Latvian actresses
Winners of the Golden Gramophone Award